Pyramid Natarajan is a former Indian actor and producer, who has appeared in character roles in Tamil cinema. He made his breakthrough as an actor playing a role in Mani Ratnam's Alaipayuthey (2000) portraying the role of Madhavan's father, before playing the antagonist in several films.

Career 
Natarajan was born in a village called Valoothoor near, Papanasam, Thanjavur, Tamil Nadu and studied in Shaukathul Islam Balya Muslim Sangam Higher Elementary School in his boyhood and moved to Madras as a teenager, hoping to make a breakthrough into films. He was able to briefly join K. Balachandar's drama troupe, Ragini Recreations, and appear in productions before soon starting his own troupe and staging a play. Following a successful business proposal, Natarajan was able to take over as executive producer of Gemini Films and was able to learn the nuances of administration.

Understanding Natarajan's potential, K. Balachandar proposed to form Kavithalayaa Productions as a joint production company and the team successfully went on to produce several successful films including those starring Rajinikanth and Kamal Haasan. Natarajan also produced Roja under the banner, sitting in on A. R. Rahman's first audition to become composer of the film. After nearly a decade and a half with Kavithalaya, Natarajan came out to form, Pyramid Films International and has made nearly 10 films under the banner.

He is currently running a hotel called "Maavadu.in".

Notable filmography

Actor

Producer

References

External links 
 

Living people
Male actors in Tamil cinema
Male actors from Tamil Nadu
Tamil film producers
Indian male film actors
20th-century Indian male actors
21st-century Indian male actors
Male actors in Telugu cinema
Film producers from Tamil Nadu
1940 births